Konstantin Puchkov (born 1952) is a Russian poker player, horse trainer and horse breeder from Moscow. He was the fourth Russian-born player to earn a World Series of Poker bracelet. He is best known for having earned a World Series of Poker bracelet in his first World Series of Poker in the money finish (2010 World Series of Poker Event #31: H.O.R.S.E., $1,500 buy-in) and setting the record for most in the money finishes at one series during the 2012 World Series of Poker (11).

Puchkov had gone cashless in three prior World Series of Poker Series, including 21 events in 2009 prior to winning a bracelet in his first in the money finish. He claims his 21 events without cashing is a record. He also says that at both the 2007 and 2008 World Series of Poker, he only played in the main event. He names all the horses that he breeds after poker terms. According to his World Poker Tour profile, he began playing poker exclusively in Russia, before playing internationally in 2007.

World Series of Poker

Bracelets
On June 19, Puchkov defeated "Sugar Bear" Al Barbieri heads up to win his first WSOP bracelet in 2010 World Series of Poker Event 31. Other final tablists in the event included Ken Lennaárd and Robert Mizrachi

2012 World Series of Poker
At the 2012 World Series of Poker, Puchkov finished in the money 11 times in the series, which is a record. In his 11 in the money finishes, Puchkov totaled $173,382 in prize money and reached 2 final tables. His eleventh cash came while playing events 59 and 60 simultaneously. In setting the record, he surpassed fellow Russian Nikolay Evdakov. Although he began play on July 6 as the chip leader in event #60: $10,000 2-7 Lowball (No-Limit), he made his eleventh in the money finish in event 59.

Puchkov also made a final table at the €10,450 Mixed Max No Limit Hold'em 2012 World Series of Poker Europe Event 5.

References

External links 
 Konstantin Puchkov at Card Player.com
 Konstantin Puchkov at WSOP.com
 Konstantin Puchkov at Bluff Magazine
 Konstantin Puchkov at Hendon Mob

1952 births
Living people
Scientists from Moscow
Russian poker players
World Series of Poker bracelet winners